Kim So-ya (Hangul: 김소야; born April 2, 1990) is a South Korean singer, known mononymously as Soya. She debuted in 2010 as a member of the duo Soya n' Sun under 101 Entertainment.

Career

2008–2009: Pre-debut
In 2008, Soya participated in the soundtrack for The World That They Live In. The next year, Kim sang three songs for the soundtrack of The Slingshot.

2010–present: Soya n' sun, solo debut and 1st Mini Album
In April 2010, Kim became a member of the duo Soya N'Sun. The duo only released one digital single before Kim debuted as a soloist in November with the single "매일매일 사랑해 (I Love You Everyday)" featuring Kim Jong-kook.

Kim participated in the reality show The Unit in 2017 but was eliminated early in episode 7, placing in 46th place.

In 2018, Kim released three singles, titled "Show" on 31 January, "Oasis" on 18 April and "Y-Shirt" on 31 July.

Her debut EP, "Artist" was released on 17 October 2018.

Personal life
Kim is the niece of Kim Jong-kook.

Discography

Extended plays

Single albums

Singles

Soundtrack appearances

Filmography

Television shows

References

External links 

 Soya on GH Entertainment

South Korean women pop singers
Singers from Seoul
Living people
1990 births
South Korean female idols
K-pop singers
21st-century South Korean women singers
South Korean Buddhists